Feride Hilal Akın (born 8 March 1996) is a Turkish pop singer, songwriter and actress.

Akın, who was raised in Ankara, finished her high school there. She started performing on stage at the age of 17. Her breakthrough came through duets with singers such as İlyas Yalçıntaş. Meanwhile, she was also cast in Show TV's series Yeni Gelin and portrayed the character of "Şirin". Her song "Yok Yok" charted many music charts in Turkey and received a nomination at the Golden Butterfly Awards as the Best Song of the Year. In 2020, she collaborated with Buray and KÖK$VL on the song "Rampapapam".

Discography

Singles

Filmography

TV series

References

External links

Feride Hilal Akın on Spotify

Living people
1996 births
Turkish women singers
Singers from Istanbul
Turkish lyricists
Musicians from Ankara